First Church of Evans Complex is a historic Presbyterian church complex located at Derby in Erie County, New York.  The  property includes the church, cemeteries, farmhouse (manse), and historic Ingersoll barn with later additions that serves as a community clubhouse.  The church is an eclectic Colonial Revival style structure designed by Buffalo architects Mann and Cook and constructed in 1915.  The original cemetery includes graves that predate the congregation's founding in 1818.

It was listed on the National Register of Historic Places in 2006.

Gallery

References

External links

First Church of Evans website

Churches on the National Register of Historic Places in New York (state)
Colonial Revival architecture in New York (state)
Churches completed in 1915
20th-century Presbyterian church buildings in the United States
Presbyterian churches in New York (state)
Churches in Erie County, New York
National Register of Historic Places in Erie County, New York